Marc G. Caron (July 26, 1946 – April 25, 2022) was a Canadian-born American researcher and James B. Duke Professor of Cell Biology at Duke University.
He was one of the top highly cited researchers (h>100) according to webometrics.

Caron died on April 25, 2022, aged 75.

References 

1946 births
2022 deaths
Duke University faculty
21st-century American biologists
20th-century American biologists
People from Chaudière-Appalaches